This is a list of American Stanley Cup Finals television announcers.

Play-by-play

NBC aired Games 1 and 4 of the 1966 Stanley Cup Finals between the Montreal Canadiens and the Detroit Red Wings. Win Elliot served as the play-by-play man while Bill Mazer served as the color commentator for the games.

For the 1968 playoffs, Jim Gordon worked play-by-play and Stu Nahan worked color commentator and intermission interviews for CBS. During the regular season, Gordon and Nahan alternated roles each week. For instance, Gordon did the worked play-by-play on December 30 while Nahan worked play-by-play the next week. In , Dan Kelly did play-by-play while Bill Mazer did color and intermission interviews. For the CBS' Stanley Cup Finals coverage during this period, a third voice was added to the booth (Phil Esposito in 1971 and Harry Howell in 1972).

From –, NBC not only televised the Stanley Cup Finals (including a couple of games in prime time), but also weekly regular season games on Sunday afternoons. NBC also aired one regular season and a couple of playoff games in prime time during the first couple of seasons. Tim Ryan and Ted Lindsay (with Brian McFarlane as the intermission host) served as the commentators for NBC's NHL coverage during this period.

For the Stanley Cup Finals, Jiggs McDonald served as the play-by-play man while Bill Clement was the color commentator for SportsChannel America. Also during the Stanley Cup Finals, Mike Emrick served as the host while John Davidson served as the rinkside and intermission analyst (Herb Brooks filled that role in 1989).

2003 was the only year that ABC broadcast both the NBA and the Stanley Cup Finals that involved teams from one city in the same year, as both the New Jersey Nets and the New Jersey Devils were in their respective league's finals. During ABC's broadcast of game three between the San Antonio Spurs and the Nets in New Jersey on June 8, Brad Nessler said that ABC was in a unique situation getting ready for both that game and game seven of the Stanley Cup Finals between the Devils and the Mighty Ducks of Anaheim the following night, also at Continental Airlines Arena. Gary Thorne mentioned this the following night, and thanked Nessler for promoting ABC's broadcast of game seven of the Stanley Cup Finals.

CBC feeds (-)

Color commentators

CBC feeds (–)

Ice-level reporters

Rules analysts

Studio hosts

NBC's coverage of the 1966 Stanley Cup Finals marked the first time that hockey games were broadcast on network television in color. The CBC would follow suit the following year. NBC's Stanley Cup coverage preempted a sports anthology series called NBC Sports in Action, hosted by Jim Simpson and Bill Cullen, who were between-periods co-hosts for the Stanley Cup broadcasts.

In the  season, Al Trautwig took over as studio host for the USA Network. Dan Kelly did play-by-play with either Gary Green or Rod Gilbert on color commentary. For the playoffs, Dick Carlson and Al Albert were added as play-by-play voices of some games. Meanwhile, Jim Van Horne hosted Stanley Cup Finals games played in Vancouver.

Things pretty much remained the same for USA during the  season. Dan Kelly and Gary Green called most games, while Al Albert did play-by-play on several playoff games and hosted one game of the Stanley Cup Finals.

CBC feeds (-)

Studio analysts

CBC feeds (-)

Broadcast networks
 CBS (-)
 Fox (-)
 NBC (-; -)
 TNT

CBS managed to televise the 1971 Stanley Cup Finals clincher on a Tuesday night and the 1972 Stanley Cup Finals clincher on a Thursday night. In 1971, CBS was not scheduled to broadcast Game 7 of the Stanley Cup Finals, but showed the prime time contest (the first ever occurrence of a NHL game being nationally televised in prime time in the United States) between the Montreal Canadiens and Chicago Black Hawks after fans reportedly swamped switchboards at network headquarters in New York City asking that the seventh game be televised. Ironically, the game was not telecast by CBS' Chicago owned-and-operated station WBBM-TV, nor on CBS affiliates in most of Illinois (except areas near St. Louis), and parts of Indiana, Wisconsin and Iowa, due to Blackhawks' owner Arthur M. Wirtz policy of not telecasting home games. For the CBS' Stanley Cup Finals coverage during this period, a third voice was added to the booth (Phil Esposito in 1971 and Harry Howell in 1972).

During the 1972 Stanley Cup Finals between the Boston Bruins and New York Rangers, CBS took a rather calculated risk in not televising the Game 5 match on May 9 (CBS aired regular programming, including the original Hawaii Five-O in that time period on that Tuesday night). This was despite the fact that Game 5 was a potential clincher with the Bruins up three games to one on the Rangers. CBS ultimately lucked out (since the Rangers won Game 5 3–2), and televised the clincher (Game 6) on Thursday night, May 11.

In , ABC was contracted to televise game seven of the Stanley Cup Finals. Since the Finals ended in five games, the contract was void. Had there been a Game 7, then Al Michaels would have called play-by-play alongside Jim McKay (between-periods host), Bobby Clarke (color commentator), and Frank Gifford (reporter, who would have been in the winning team's dressing room to interview players and coaches as well as hand the phone to the winning team's coach that would have allowed him to talk to both President Jimmy Carter and Prime Minister Pierre Trudeau). This would give Michaels the honor of being the first announcer to call the play-by-play in all four major sports, having called the Super Bowl, the World Series, and NBA Finals. The game would have started at 5:10 p.m. Eastern Daylight Time on a Saturday, replacing Wide World of Sports and local news shows that typically followed it on ABC stations in the Eastern and Central time zones.

Mainly influenced by the United States men's Olympic hockey team's surprise gold medal victory (dubbed "The Miracle on Ice") in Lake Placid several months prior, CBS agreed to pay $37 million to broadcast the sixth game of the 1980 Stanley Cup Finals. In return, the NHL happily moved the starting time from prime time to the afternoon. The Saturday afternoon game was the first full American network telecast of an NHL game since Game 5 of the 1975 Stanley Cup Finals aired on NBC. By this time, Dan Kelly was joined by former NHL on NBC commentator, Tim Ryan. Kelly did play-by-play for the first and third periods as well as overtime. Meanwhile, Tim Ryan did play-by-play only for the second period. Minnesota North Stars general manager Lou Nanne was the color commentator throughout the game. This turned out to be the last NHL game on American network television until NBC televised the 1990 All-Star Game.

FOX split coverage of the Stanley Cup Finals with ESPN. Game 1 of the 1995 Stanley Cup Finals was the first Finals game shown on network television since  and the first in prime time since 1973. FOX was scheduled to televise Games 1, 5, and 7; and ESPN airs Games 2, 3, 4, and 6. However, from 1995 to 1998, the Finals matches were all four game sweeps; the  Finals ended in six games. The consequence was that – except for 1995, when Fox did televise game four – the decisive game was never shown on network television. Perhaps in recognition of this, Games 3 through 7 were always televised by ABC in the succeeding broadcast agreement between the NHL and ABC Sports/ESPN.

Before the 2004–05 lockout, the NHL had reached two separate deals with NBC (who would replace ABC as the NHL's American national broadcast television partner) and ESPN. ESPN offered the NHL $60 million for about 40 games (only fifteen of which would be during the regular season), all on ESPN2, with presumably, only some midweek playoff games, the first two games of the Stanley Cup Finals and the All-Star Game airing on ESPN. The NBC deal stipulated that the network would pay the league no rights fees - an unheard of practice to that point. NBC's deal included six regular season windows, seven postseason broadcasts and Games 3–7 of the Stanley Cup Finals in primetime.  The contracts were to commence when the lockout ended. The NBC deal expired after the 2006–07 season, and NBC had picked up the option to renew for the 2007–08 season (Just like the AFL/NBC agreement, which the network did not renew in 2006). The NHL and NBC shared in revenues from advertising.

As part of ESPN's new deal with the NHL, which starts with the 2021–22 season, ABC will exclusively air four Stanley Cup Finals over the life of the contract (2022, 2024, 2026, and 2028). This will be the first time that a broadcast over-the-air network will exclusively air the Stanley Cup Finals.

Cable
 TNT
 ESPN (-; -)
 NBCSN (-)
 OLN/Versus (-)
 SportsChannel America (-)
 USA (-)

In all, USA covered about 55 games, including 33 in the regular season. Also, Hartford Whalers goaltender Mike Liut was added as an intermission analyst for the Stanley Cup Finals.

Games 1 and 2 of the 2006 Stanley Cup Finals were on OLN, while the remainder of the series was on NBC.

 
In , NBCSN broadcast Games 3 and 4, while NBC televised the remaining games. NBC Sports originally planned to repeat its coverage pattern from the last few seasons: NBCSN would televise Games 2 and 3, while NBC would broadcast Game 1, and then Games 4 through 7. After the League scheduled Game 2 on the day of the Belmont Stakes, coverage of games two and four were switched so NBC's telecast of the horse race would serve as lead-in programming to Game 2. Due to the death of a family member, NBC lead play-by-play announcer Mike Emrick missed Game 1. Kenny Albert, who was also the New York Rangers radio announcer for WEPN and announced several national games (including the Western Conference Finals) for NBC/NBCSN, filled in for Emrick in the first game.

It was originally announced that Games 2 and 3 of the  Finals were to be broadcast by NBCSN, with the remainder on NBC. Game 2 was moved to NBC to serve as a lead-out for its coverage of the 2015 Belmont Stakes in favor of Game 4 on NBCSN. As Eddie Olczyk was also a contributor to NBC's Belmont coverage, he missed Game 2.

On May 27, 2016, NBC Sports announced that if the Finals was tied at 1-1 entering Game 3, then it would have aired on NBC and Game 4 televised on NBCSN. However, if one team led 2-0 (as this eventually happened; Penguins led 2–0), Game 3 would be moved to NBCSN and then Game 4 on NBC.

Pursuant to the announcement of Turner Sports claiming the NHL's new “B” package for the 2021–22 season, on April 27, 2021, TNT will air three Stanley Cup Finals in 2023, 2025 and 2027.

Syndication 
 Hughes
 NHL Network (-)
 RKO General

In the United States, the clinching game of the 1966 Stanley Cup Finals on the evening of Thursday, May 5 aired on RKO General's stations, such as WOR-TV in New York City and WHCT in Hartford, Connecticut. The commentators for RKO's coverage on that occasion were Bob Wolff and Emile Francis. Wolff at the time did play-by-play for New York Rangers games seen on WOR. Although the TV listings page of the May 5, 1966 edition of the Boston Globe indicated that RKO-owned WNAC-TV in Boston would not carry the game, the then-ABC-affiliated station did clear the broadcast at the last minute.

The 1976 Stanley Cup Finals on the NHL Network marked the first time that the NHL's championship series was nationally televised in its entirety in the United States. Starting in the 1978 playoffs, the NHL Network began simulcasting many games with Hockey Night in Canada.  In these games, Dan Kelly, who was the NHL Network's lead play-by-play broadcaster, was assigned to do play-by-play along with HNIC color commentators.

The entire 1979 Stanley Cup Finals between the Montreal Canadiens and New York Rangers was simulcast as well. However, had that final gone to Game 7, then that game would have been broadcast on ABC.

Hughes televised Games 1-5 of the 1980 Stanley Cup Finals (the final game, Game 6, was broadcast by CBS). Hughes technically, used CBC's Hockey Night in Canada feeds for the American coverage of the first five games of the Stanley Cup Finals.

See also 
 Current broadcasters 
 Ratings

Announcers by network
 ABC
 CBS
 Fox
 NBC

Cable
 ESPN
 NBCSN
 OLN/Versus
 SportsChannel America
 USA

Syndication
 Hughes
 NHL Network
 RKO General

References

Stanley Cup Finals
Lists of National Hockey League broadcasters
ABC Sports
CBS Sports
Fox Sports announcers
NHL on NBC
ESPN announcers
SportsChannel
USA Network Sports
Hughes Television Network
Turner Sports